Devlet is the Turkish word for "state", a borrowing from Arabic dawla (دولة) via Persian dowlat (دولت). It has also been used as a given name. It may refer to:

Devlet Bahçeli (born 1948), Turkish politician and chairman of the far-right Nationalist Movement Party
Devlet Hatun (died 1411), consort of Ottoman Sultan Bayezid I and the mother of Sultan Mehmed I
Devletşah Hatun, consort of Ottoman Sultan Bayezid I
Devlet Giray (disambiguation), four Crimean khans

Turkish masculine given names